Rehana Begum is a noted artisan of India. She is resident of Lucknow in Uttar Pradesh in India and is an expert in Chikan (embroidery) work. She was born in 1952 and learnt the craft from her father Hasan Mirza. Her work is on display at Craft Museum of Uttar Pradesh. She has participated in many exhibitions.

She was conferred Shilp Guru award by Government of India for her outstanding work.

External links

Indian artisans
Artists from Lucknow
Living people
1952 births
Women artists from Uttar Pradesh
20th-century Indian women artists
Indian embroiderers